Djalal Ardjoun Khalil is a Chadian politician, teacher, and researcher.

Khalil has been Minister of Women, Early childhood Protection and National Solidarity since November 9, 2018.

Career
Khalil was Minister of Tourism Development, Culture and Handicrafts from May 8, 2018, to November 9, 2018.

References

Living people
Culture ministers of Chad
Tourism ministers of Chad
Women's ministers of Chad
21st-century Chadian women politicians
21st-century Chadian politicians
Year of birth missing (living people)